The R185 road is a regional road in Ireland linking the N12 near Tyholland in County Monaghan and the border with Northern Ireland. The road passes through the village of Glaslough. Across the border, it continues as an unclassified route towards the villages of Tynan and Caledon.

See also 

 Roads in Ireland
 National primary road
 National secondary road

References 

Regional roads in the Republic of Ireland
Roads in County Monaghan